Reformed Presbyterian Church Parsonage is a historic Reformed Presbyterian church parsonage on Duanesburg Churches Road in Duanesburg, Schenectady County, New York. It was built about 1829 and is a two-story, five-bay, frame vernacular Federal style residence.  It has a gable roof with cornice returns, a narrow frieze, clapboard siding, and slender corner boards.  It has a two-story rear wing.  Also on the property is a contributing barn.

The property was listed on the National Register of Historic Places in 1987.

References

External links
Church's Official Website

Federal architecture in New York (state)
Houses completed in 1829
Houses on the National Register of Historic Places in New York (state)
Houses in Schenectady County, New York
Clergy houses in the United States
National Register of Historic Places in Schenectady County, New York